Péter Baráth (born 21 February 2002) is a Hungarian professional footballer who plays for OTP Bank Liga club Ferencváros on loan from Debrecen.

Club career
On 14 February 2023, Baráth joined Hungarian champions Ferencváros.

International career
Baráth was called up by the senior Hungary team for the Nations League matches against England (home), Italy (away), Germany (home) and England (away) on 4, 7, 11 and 14 June 2022 respectively.

Career statistics

References

External links
 
 

2002 births
People from Kisvárda
Sportspeople from Szabolcs-Szatmár-Bereg County
Living people
Hungarian footballers
Hungary youth international footballers
Hungary under-21 international footballers
Association football midfielders
Debreceni VSC players
Ferencvárosi TC footballers
Nemzeti Bajnokság I players
Nemzeti Bajnokság II players